The Southwestern Athletic Conference baseball tournament decides the conference baseball championship of the NCAA Division I Southwestern Athletic Conference. The top four finishers in each conference division participate in a two-bracket, double-elimination tournament, most recently played in Birmingham, Alabama, between May 25 and May 29, 2022. The winner of the tournament receives an automatic berth to the NCAA tournament and, since 2019, to the HBCU World Series.

History

Background
The SWAC was established in 1920, and the conference is known to have sponsored baseball as a league sport until around the uncertain times of the Great Depression and World World II before sanctioning it again in 1949. Between 1959 and 2003, only Southern, Jackson State, and Grambling State won SWAC championships. The league office itself has even been known to refer to these schools as the "Big Three." However, since 2004, seven programs have won championships, suggesting greater competitiveness in the league. Also, with the SWAC tournament now including eight schools, simply more lower-seeded teams have an opportunity to compete for the conference crown. However, allowing lower-seeded teams to stake claim to the title and automatic bid to the NCAA tournament may have also come with a price; from 2000—when the SWAC tournament field expanded to six teams—to 2016, SWAC entrants went just 4–36 in NCAA regional play.

Origins of the modern tournament
Though the league championship was normally determined by the regular season conference standings, for a brief time after the SWAC renewed sponsorship of baseball in 1949, a championship series was held. The roots of the modern tournament began in 1977 when the league split into eastern and western divisions, with the division winners facing off in a best-of-three championship series; Jackson State and Southern met in that first series. A true tournament format was initially planned for the conclusion of the 1980 regular season, but SWAC officials were unable to assemble it in time—so another two-team championship series ended up being held in its place instead. After the 1980 series featured a fourth consecutive JSU–SU match-up, the series was successfully converted into a more inclusive four-team, double-elimination tournament for the 1981 season, guaranteeing that at least one school that had never won the SWAC title before could compete in it (the four-team field was expanded to six teams in 2000 and eight teams in 2008). That first tournament, held in Grambling, Louisiana, actually had the reverse effect though as it included division champions Grambling and Alcorn State—but then still gave division runners-up Southern and Jackson State yet another opportunity to win the title; indeed, Southern did win the rain-delayed tournament. Only Alcorn State's 1997 title game appearance prevented the Big Three from having a complete monopoly over the finals until 2003. However, between 2003 and 2019, every single title game had at least one non-Big Three team in it.

Host cities and venues
Initially, the earliest tournaments alternated between the home stadiums of the western and eastern division champions. Although the event had been played off-campus before (at Pete Goldsby Field, in Baton Rouge, Louisiana), it was played in a non-qualifier's hometown (Houston, home of Texas Southern) for the first time in 1985 and then moved to its first true neutral location for the 1986 edition—a rainy affair held at the old Bringhurst Field in Alexandria, Louisiana. But the tournament has not evolved without growing pains. It has changed locations numerous times over the years (including nine different stadiums for the eight tournaments played between 1999 and 2006). The tournament has not necessarily been easy for potential host cities to bid on, as the SWAC office has sometimes preferred bids that cover multiple sports facilities for an entire "SWAC Spring Sports Festival" encompassing all league-sponsored sports that have championship tournaments near the end of the spring semester. Also, promises made during these bidding processes have not necessarily always come to pass. For example, the 2004 championship game was supposed to be played at Minute Maid Park, a Major League Baseball stadium, but this was ultimately not pursued after Houston's bid was accepted.

Evolving tournament formats
The competition's changing format has also been questioned. In 2002 a weary columnist for the Baton Rouge Advocate lamented, "The SWAC Tournament has had a different venue and a different format each of the last four years. In that span, there have been times where both the site and the format were decided just weeks before the event." Indeed, multiple people associated with the Southern program over the years have expressed disappointment with format adjustments, hinting that it could be done to reduce odds of the Jaguars winning yet another tournament. One of the tournament's most vocal critics has been Roger Cador, who served as an assistant or head coach at Southern during most of the SWAC tournaments that have been held. In 2019 the league office responded by hiring Cador in an advisory role as staff liaison to "assist with marketing, promotions, and game management/event operations" for the tournament.

Notable games and superlatives
Southern ultimately ended up advancing to the first twelve playoff and tournament championship games and then reached another nine in a row between 1991 and 1999. Besides the partial cancellation of the 1980 tournament, in 1993 the then-Natchez, Mississippi-based tournament was canceled by SWAC commissioner James Frank before the championship game could be played, due to the field's condition after enduring lightning and rain delays with only "makeshift tarps" available; the title game participants, Jackson State and Southern, were subsequently declared co-champions. This was not the first rain-plagued tournament held in Natchez, nor was it the last. In 1994 rain pushed Southern into playing three full nine-inning games on the day of the championship; the exhausted team ended up losing the finale by a mere one run. In 1995 the stadium was double-booked with Mississippi High School Activities Association playoff games during one of the days. In 2004 Texas Southern not only broke the Big Three's hold on the trophy but also set a title game scoring record in the process by winning 18–1. The 2005 tournament, which was held at historic Rickwood Field in Birmingham—then the new home of the SWAC offices—was suspended during the record 15th inning of the championship game due to stray gunfire generated from a gang fight that occurred on the street behind the center field wall; the teams and fans alike were forced to scramble for cover. Since then, the tournaments have been held relatively drama-free; however, even then rain delays at the 2008 event required the use of an additional facility in an attempt to stay on schedule with its new eight-team format. In 2021 JSU (which had finished 24–0 in league play and was also undefeated in the conference tournament) lost the title game to Southern 7–6 following a dramatic 3-run, ninth inning home run; the responding outfielder was unable to make a play on the ball after colliding with, and falling through, an unlocked bullpen gate.

Current status
A multi-year contract to hold the tournament at LaGrave Field in Fort Worth, Texas starting with the 2013 tourney was canceled after only one year due to the venue being in a state of disrepair. The event found a stable home after that at Wesley Barrow Stadium in New Orleans, which is associated with initiatives by the Major League Baseball Urban Youth Academy to promote increased participation by minorities in the sport—something that the SWAC has a vested interest in as a conference for historically black universities. In 2019 New Orleans served as a host city for the SWAC tournament for the tenth time—the most of any city (Natchez's Chester Willis Field is the venue that has hosted both the most tournaments overall and the most consecutive tournaments—eight between 1988 and 1995). A three-year deal was then signed in 2020 to return the tournament to Smith–Wills Stadium in Jackson, Mississippi. However, just two weeks after that agreement was announced, the NCAA canceled all spring championship events for the 2020 season, due to the COVID–19 pandemic. Then, less than a month before the 2021 tournament, it was announced that it would be relocated from Jackson to Toyota Field in Madison, Alabama "due to enhanced COVID–19 protocols." The 2022 tournament was relocated as well, to Birmingham.

Champions

Conference tournament championships by year
The following is a list of conference tournament champions and tournament sites, organized by year. The tournament determined the conference's overall championship each year that it was played; in years that it was not held, conference standings generated through regular season play determined the overall champions. However, the league office apparently does not acknowledge titles earned prior to 1959 in its public releases. It is not immediately clear if this is due to space constraints or poor record-keeping—or if the conference simply does not consider pre-1959 titles as "official." At that time the SWAC began to change significantly with a shift in membership from smaller, private Christian colleges in and around Texas—many of whom are now members of the National Association of Intercollegiate Athletics's Red River Athletic Conference—to larger, secular public universities spread throughout the Deep South (Grambling and Jackson State were particularly notable additions, especially as far as baseball competition was concerned), and Southern also won the 1959 NAIA World Series. The conference also began to change demographically at that time as well, with southern universities beginning to integrate.

Championship series-era champions

Note: Bishop College won the Northern Division outright in 1950 and 1951 but tied with Arkansas–Pine Bluff in 1949, facing them in a best-of-three series for the right to advance and play the Southern Division winner in a best-of-three series; Southern won the Southern Division in 1949 and 1950, and Texas College won it in 1951.

Playoff-era champions

Tournament-era champions

Note: in 1993 Jackson State and Southern were declared co-champions, due to weather forcing the cancellation of the SWAC Tournament final.

Conference tournament championships by school
The following is a list of conference tournament champions, organized by school.

See also

 List of Southwestern Athletic Conference baseball champions

References